The Climăuț (also: Moise) is a left tributary of the river Suceava in Ukraine and Romania. Its source is located near Stary Vovchynets, Ukraine. The river then crosses the border into Romania, crosses the village of Climăuți, joining the Suceava near the village of Iaz.

References

Rivers of Romania
Rivers of Chernivtsi Oblast
Rivers of Suceava County